Edward Tatnall Nichols (March 1, 1823October 12, 1886) was a United States Navy rear admiral.

Career
Nichols began his naval service by being appointed to the U.S. Navy from Georgia on December 14, 1836. He was first attached to the sloop USS Levant and served in the West Indies Squadron, 1837-1840. He attended the Philadelphia Naval School, 1841-1842. 

Nicholas passed as a midshipman July 1, 1842 and was assigned to the frigate USS Columbus in the Mediterranean Squadron serving until 1844. The following year, Nichols served aboard the steamer USS Colonel Harney in the Atlantic Fleet and transferred to the frigate USS Columbia in the Brazil Squadron where here served until 1847. 

He was transferred again in 1847 to the bomb brig USS Stromboli in the Home Squadron, serving with her crew in 1847 and 1848. In his last assignment as a midshipman, Nichols served aboard the frigate USS Savannah in the Pacific Squadron, 1849-1851. Nichols was commissioned lieutenant on March 13, 1850 while serving aboard the USS Savannah.

Nichols was posted to the Pensacola Navy Yard in 1852 and 1853. He again transferred to the Mediterranean Squadron and served aboard the steam frigate USS Saranac, 1853 to 1856. Nichols served at the Portsmouth Navy Yard in 1857-1858, then served aboard the USS Jamestown, from 1858 until 1860.

With the outbreak of the Civil War, Nichols remained loyal to the United States and was given command of the steamer USS Winona in the West Gulf Blockading Squadron. Nichols participated in the bombardment of forts Jackson and St. Philip, receiving the latter's surrender on April 28, 1862. He was then present with the 38-vessel flotilla commanded by Rear Admiral David Farragut during the attack on and passing of the batteries at Vicksburg, Mississippi on June 28, 1862. The USS Winona engaged the CSS Arkansas and again engaged and passed the Vicksburg batteries on July 15, 1862.

Nichols was promoted to commander on July 16, 1862. In 1863 he commanded of the steamer USS Alabama in the West India Blockading Squadron. The following year he was in command of the steamer USS Mendota of the North Atlantic Blockading Squadron and retained that command until 1866 when he was assigned special duty in New York City. With the USS Mendota, Nichols saw heavy action when he engaged a rebel battery at Four Mile Creek on the James River, June 16, 1864. The Mendota was again engaged at the First Battle of Deep Bottom, being the only Navy vessel in support.

Receiving promotion to captain on July 25, 1866, Nichols served on the command staff of the Asiatic Squadron. He was promoted to chief-of-staff of the squadron in 1870 and held that post until 1872. Nichols was promoted to commodore May 24, 1872 and served as commandant of the Boston Navy Yard, 1872-1876. He served as member of the Navy's Board of Examiners in 1877 and commissioned rear admiral February 25, 1878, commanding the South Atlantic Squadron until 1879. In his last years of service, Nichols was a light house inspector.

Family
Nichols married Caroline Elizabeth Bowers (18291865) on November 12, 1851 in Rhode Island. They had two children:  Helen Bowers (18501935) and Edward Tatnall Jr. (18541934).

Later life
Nichols left the U.S. Navy in 1882. He died October 12, 1886 and is buried with his wife and children at Swan Point Cemetery, Providence, Rhode Island.

Dates of rank
 Midshipman - December 14, 1836
 Passed Midshipman - July 1, 1842
 Lieutenant - March 13, 1850
 Commander - July 16, 1862
 Captain - July 25, 1866
 Commodore - May 24, 1872
 Rear Admiral - February 25, 1878

See also

 Union Blockade
 Union Navy

References 

1823 births
1886 deaths
People from Georgia (U.S. state)
People of Georgia (U.S. state) in the American Civil War
Southern Unionists in the American Civil War
United States Navy rear admirals (upper half)
Burials at Swan Point Cemetery